New York Life Insurance Building or New York Life Building may refer to:
 New York Life Insurance Building (Montreal)
 New York Life Insurance Building (Chicago), Illinois
 New York Life Building (Kansas City, Missouri)
 New York Life Building, New York City
 The former New York Life Insurance Company Building, now 108 Leonard, New York City